This is a list of Egyptian frigates of the period 1640-1870:
They were built in Alexandria, Marseille, Venice or Trieste.

Sail frigates
Guerriere/Murchid-i-Djihad 60 - Ran aground during the Battle of Navarino and later scuttled, 1827
Ihsania 64 - Blew up during the Battle of Navarino, 1827
Leone 60 - Damaged during the Battle of Navarino, 1827, refloated, renamed Sir Djihad
Souriya 56 - Ran aground and sank during the Battle of Navarino, 1827
l'Egyptienne 60 - Renamed Raschid
Kafr-el-Cheyk 58 - Wrecked 1840
Damiat 52 (c.1829) - Sunk in the Battle of Sinop, 1853
Menousich 60
Bahira 60

Sail frigates surrendered by Turkey in 1839 and returned in 1840
Nousratie 74
Sourie 60
Chadie 60
Elzraman 60
Nesamie 50
Nouhan Bahari 50
M'sian Zafer 50
Chabal Bahari 50
Nassim Zafer 40
Fazl Illah 40 (ex-Russian Rafail 44, captured 1829)

Steam frigates
Mehemet Ali laid up 1880
Ibrahim (1868) - BU c. 1890

Bibliography
 

Frigates, sail
Lists of ships by country
Lists of sailing ships
Lists of frigates
Sail frigates